“Possession” is a song by Canadian singer-songwriter Sarah McLachlan, and was the first single from her album Fumbling Towards Ecstasy. It was written and composed by McLachlan herself and was produced by Pierre Marchand. It was released in Canada on 10 September 1993 by Nettwerk Records. The song appears twice on the album, as the first track and as a hidden track at the end, which is a solo piano version. “Possession” is written from the viewpoint of a man obsessed with a woman, and was inspired by consistent fan letters to McLachlan some time before the writing of the song. The most famous ones are from a computer programmer from Ottawa, Ontario named Uwe Vandrei, who sued McLachlan for using his words without crediting him. However, Vandrei died by suicide before the case could ever be taken to court.

The main recording of "Possession" also appeared on the 2008 compilation album Closer: The Best of Sarah McLachlan, and McLachlan has also released live, alternate and remixed versions of the song.

Inspiration
The song was inspired by McLachlan's reaction to two deranged fans, both of whom had concocted a fantasy in which they were already in a relationship with her. Of the two, the more famous is Uwe Vandrei, an Ottawa, Ontario native who sued McLachlan in 1994, alleging that his love letters to her had been the basis of "Possession". Vandrei had written and sent McLachlan love poems, although there is no direct connection between those poems and the lyrics of "Possession." Vandrei's lawsuit never came to trial as he died by suicide in the autumn of 1994.

In an interview with Rolling Stone three years later, McLachlan said, "And this one person wasn't the only guy ... there were a lot of letters from other people saying the same kind of thing ... Writing the song 'Possession' was very therapeutic." She also stated that, since the release of "Possession," she had stopped getting stalker-type fan letters, for which she was grateful.

Music videos

Canadian version 
The original version of the video features a remixed background track and depicts Sarah McLachlan wrapped in white cloth, as Eve,  Potiphar's wife, and other such biblical references, depicting vanity, deceit, corruption, intimacy and other taboos of conservative society. As McLachlan explained:

This video was directed by McLachlan herself, and features her friends and band members.

United States version
The video for the US market released in 1994 features the original album version of the song being played by McLachlan and her band in a cathedral-style hall. It was directed by Julie Hermelin.

Track listing 
Nettwerk / W2-6319 (Canada)
 "Possession" (Version I)
 "Possession" (Version II)
 "Fear" (Jane's Mix)

 Version II remixed by John Fryer; remix also featured on the "I Will Remember You" single.

Arista / 07822-12662-2 (US)
 "Possession"
 "Fear" (Jane's Mix)
 "Mary" (Early Version)
 "Black" (Live at Harbourfront, Toronto), taken from Live EP

Charts

Weekly charts

Year-end charts

Other versions
In addition to the two different versions of "Possession" appearing on the Fumbling Towards Ecstasy album, a live recording of the song is available on McLachlan's 1999 live concert album Mirrorball. A fourth version, the Rabbit in the Moon remix, is available on two different McLachlan remix albums: Rarities, B-Sides and Other Stuff and Remixed.

McLachlan recorded another version of the song for the 2005 iTunes-only digital album iTunes Originals – Sarah McLachlan.

Cover versions
The Canadian alternative rock band Evans Blue covered "Possession" on their first album The Melody and the Energetic Nature of Volume.
 Smile Empty Soul included a cover of "Possession" on their 2007 EP B-Sides.
 The German gothic metal rock band ASP covered "Possession" on their EP Werben.
 British trance act Transfer released a dance version of "Possession" in 2001.
 Canadian hard rock/metal band Hellrazor covered "Possession" on their 2020 Hero No More album.

References

External links 

1993 singles
Music videos directed by Sophie Muller
Sarah McLachlan songs
Arista Records singles
Nettwerk Records singles
Songs written by Sarah McLachlan
1993 songs
Songs involved in plagiarism controversies